The 2012 Kentucky Wildcats baseball team represented the University of Kentucky in the 2012 NCAA Division I baseball season.  The Wildcats played their home games in Cliff Hagan Stadium. The team was coached by Gary Henderson, who was in his fourth season at Kentucky.

Personnel

Roster

Schedule

! style="background:#005DAA;color:white;"| Regular Season (41–15)
|- valign="top" 

|- bgcolor="#ccffcc"
| 1 || February 17 || @ || Russell C. King Field || 10–4 || Rogers (1–0) || Collins (0–1) || none || 491 || 1–0 || –
|- bgcolor="#ccffcc"
| 2 || February 18 ||  || Russell C. King Field || 10–2 || Grundy (1–0) || Battistelli (0–1) || none || 257 || 2–0 ||–
|- bgcolor="#ccffcc"
| 3 || February 20 ||  || Russell C. King Field || 6–0 || Littrell (1–0) || Lee (0–1) || none || 256 || 3–0 || –
|- bgcolor="#ccffcc"
| 4 || February 24 || Buffalo || Cliff Hagan Stadium || 13–4 || Rogers (2–0) || Copping (0–1) || none || 1,261 || 4–0 ||–
|- bgcolor="#ccffcc"
| 5 || February 25 || Buffalo || Cliff Hagan Stadium || 9-5 || Wijas (1-0) || Paige (0-1) || none || 1,212 || 5–0 ||–
|- bgcolor="#ccffcc"
| 6 || February 26 || Buffalo || Cliff Hagan Stadium || 7-6 || Gott (1-0) || Crumb (0-1) || none || 1,353 || 6–0 ||–
|- bgcolor="#ccffcc"
| 7 || February 28 ||  || Cliff Hagan Stadium || 3-2 || Reed (1-0) || Robertson (0-1) || Gott (1) || 1,625 || 7–0 ||–
|- bgcolor="#ccffcc"
| 8 || February 29 ||  || Cliff Hagan Stadium || 9-2 || Shepherd (1-0) || Westrick (0-1) || none || 1,317 || 8–0 ||–
|-

|- bgcolor="#ccffcc"
| 9 || March 3 ||  || Cliff Hagan Stadium || 4-3 || Rogers (3-0) || Evak (1-1) || Gott (2) || N/A || 9–0 ||–
|- bgcolor="#ccffcc"
| 10 || March 3 || Illinois-Chicago || Cliff Hagan Stadium || 8-2 || Grundy (2-0) || Begel (0-3) || none || 1,430 || 10–0 ||–
|- bgcolor="#ccffcc"
| 11 || March 4 || Illinois-Chicago || Cliff Hagan Stadium || 20-0 || Littrell (2-0) || Salemi (0-1) || none || 1,212 || 11–0 ||–
|- bgcolor="#ccffcc"
| 12 || March 6 ||  || Cliff Hagan Stadium || 10-6 || Peterson (1-0) || McWirter (0-3) || none || 1,340 || 12–0 ||–
|- bgcolor="#ccffcc"
| 13 || March 7 ||  || Cliff Hagan Stadium || 7-3 || Reed (2-0) || Stanley (0-1) || none || 1,408 || 13–0 ||–
|- bgcolor="#ccffcc"
| 14 || March 9 ||  || Cliff Hagan Stadium || 19-9 || Rogers (4-0) || Martin (1-1) || none || 1,223 || 14–0 ||–
|- bgcolor="#ccffcc"
| 15 || March 10 || Canisius || Cliff Hagan Stadium || 7-5 || Grundy (3-0) || Cortright (2-2) || none || 1,288 || 15–0 ||–
|- bgcolor="#ccffcc"
| 16 || March 11 || Canisius || Cliff Hagan Stadium || 5-4 || Phillips (1-0) || Linseman (3-1) || none || 1,277 || 16–0 ||–
|- bgcolor="#ccffcc"
| 17 || March 13 ||  || Cliff Hagan Stadium || 9-1 || Reed (3-0) || Hoelzel (1-3) || none || 1,280 || 17–0 ||–
|- bgcolor="#ccffcc"
| 18 || March 14 ||  || Cliff Hagan Stadium || 2-1 || Phillips (2-0) || Babin (1-1) || Gott (3) || 1,362 || 18–0 || –
|- bgcolor="#ccffcc"
| 19 || March 16 || South Carolina || Cliff Hagan Stadium || 4-3 || Peterson (2-0) || Beal (1-1) || none || 2,032 || 19–0 || 1–0
|- bgcolor="#ccffcc"
| 20 || March 17 || South Carolina || Cliff Hagan Stadium || 4-3 || Reed (4-0) || Price (2-1) || Gott (4) || 1,950 || 20–0 || 2–0
|- bgcolor="#ccffcc"
| 21 || March 18 || South Carolina || Cliff Hagan Stadium || 6-3 || Wijas (2-0) || Belcher (1-1) || Gott (5) || 2,571 || 21–0 || 3–0
|- bgcolor="#ccffcc"
| 22 || March 21 || @ || Marge Schott Stadium || 10-7 || Shepherd (2-0) || Walker (1-1) || Phillips (1)  || – || 22–0 || 3–0
|- align="center" bgcolor="#ffbbb"
| 23 || March 23 || @ || Lindsey Nelson Stadium || 1-4 || Godley (4-1) || Rogers (4-1) || Blount (1) || 1,516 || 22–1 || 3–1
|- bgcolor="#ccffcc"
| 24 || March 24 || @Tennessee || Lindsey Nelson Stadium || 6-2 || Phillips (3-0) || Zajac (0-1) || none || 2,322 || 23–1 || 4–1
|- bgcolor="#ccffcc"
| 25 || March 25 || @Tennessee || Lindsey Nelson Stadium || 6-0 || Littrell (3-0) || Steckenrider (1-2) || none || 2,154 || 24–1 || 5–1
|- bgcolor="#ccffcc"
| 26 || March 27 ||  || Cliff Hagan Stadium || 7-4 || Mahar (1-0) || Clay (3-3) || none || 2,385 || 25–1 || 5–1
|- align="center" bgcolor="#ffbbb"
| 27 || March 30 || @ || Foley Field || 6-7 || Benzor (4-1) || Mahar (1-1) || Dietrich (5) || - || 25–2 || 5–2
|- bgcolor="#ccffcc"
| 28 || March 31 || @Georgia || Foley Field || 9-8 || Phillips (4-0) || Crumley (1-2) || Gott (6) || 3,100 || 26–2 || 6–2
|-

|- bgcolor="#ccffcc"
| 29 || April 1 || @ || Foley Field || 11-2 || Littrell (4-0) || Palazzone (0-3) || none || 3,020 || 27–2 || 7–2
|- bgcolor="#ccffcc"
| 30 || April 4 ||  || Cliff Hagan Stadium || 19-6 || Mahar (2-1) || Konrad (3-2) || none || 1,250 || 28–2 || 7–2
|- bgcolor="#ccffcc"
| 31 || April 6 ||  || Cliff Hagan Stadium || 3-2 || Phillips (5-1) || Chavez (3-2) || Gott (7) || 2,428 || 29–2 || 8–2
|- align="center" bgcolor="#ffbbb"
| 32 || April 7 || Ole Miss || Cliff Hagan Stadium || 3-9 || Mayers (3-2) || Grundy (3-1) || none || 2,507 || 29–3 || 8–3
|- bgcolor="#ccffcc"
| 33 || April 8 || Ole Miss || Cliff Hagan Stadium || 8-3 || Littrell (5-0) || Hively (3-2) || Phillips (2) || 1,834 || 30–3 || 9–3
|- align="center" bgcolor="#ffbbb"
| 34 || April 10 ||  || Cliff Hagan Stadium || 0-12 || Ruxer (5-0) || Reed (4-1) || none || 3,563 || 30–4 || 9–3
|- align="center" bgcolor="#ffbbb"
| 35 || April 13 || @Arkansas || Baum Stadium || 7-8 || Lynch (1-1) || Phillips (5-1) || none || 6,825 || 30–5 || 9–4
|- bgcolor="#ccffcc"
| 36 || April 15 || @Arkansas || Baum Stadium || 5-4 || Shepherd (3-0) || Astin (2-3) || Peterson (1) || 9,575 || 31–5 || 10–4
|- bgcolor="#ccffcc"
| 37 || April 15 || @Arkansas || Baum Stadium || 2-1 || Littrell (6-0) || Baxendale (6-2) || Gott (8) || 9,575 || 32–5 || 11–4
|- bgcolor="#ccffcc"
| 38 || April 17 ||  || Cliff Hagan Stadium || 7-0 || Mahar (3-1) || Mergen (0-3) || none || 1,530 || 33–5 || 11–4
|- align="center" bgcolor="#ffbbb"
| 39 || April 20 || LSU || Cliff Hagan Stadium || 4-5 || Gausman (7-1) || Rogers (4-2) || Goody (6) || 3,785 || 33–6 || 11–5
|- bgcolor="#ccffcc"
| 40 || April 21 || LSU || Cliff Hagan Stadium || 8-1 || Grundy (4-1) || Eades (5-2) || Phillips (3) || 2,625 || 34–6 || 12–5
|- bgcolor="#ccffcc"
| 41 || April 22 || LSU || Cliff Hagan Stadium || 7-6 || Peterson (3-0) || Bourgeois (1-2) || Phillips (4) || 3,086 || 35–6 || 13–5
|- align="center" bgcolor="#ffbbb"
| 42 || April 24 || @Louisville || Jim Patterson Stadium || 2-10 || Green (3-0) || Mahar (3-2) || none || 3,862 || 35–7 || 13–5
|- bgcolor="#ccffcc"
| 43 || April 27 || @ || Hawkins Field || 5-2 || Rogers (5-2) || Pecoraro (0-2) || none || 2,584 || 36–7 || 14–5
|- align="center" bgcolor="#ffbbb"
| 44 || April 28 || @Vanderbilt || Hawkins Field || 3-4 || Clinard (5-2) || Mahar (3-3) || VerHagen (1) || 2,837 || 36–8 || 14–6
|- align="center" bgcolor="#ffbbb"
| 45 || April 29 || @Vanderbilt || Hawkins Field || 1-6 || Selman (6-3) || Phillips (5-2) || none || 2,885 || 36–9 || 14–7
|-

|- align="center" bgcolor="#ffbbb"
| 46 || May 3 || Florida || Cliff Hagan Stadium || 3-5 || Randall (5-1) || Rogers (5-3) || Rodriguez (1) || 2,457 || 36–10 || 14–8
|- align="center" bgcolor="#ffbbb"
| 47 || May 4 || Florida || Cliff Hagan Stadium || 1-5 || Larson (6-0) || Grundy (4-2) || Rodriguez (2) || 2,925  || 36–11 || 14–9
|- bgcolor="#ccffcc"
| 48 || May 5 || Florida || Cliff Hagan Stadium || 2-1 || Littrell (7-0) || Johnson (5-4) || Gott (9) || 2,607 || 37–11 || 15–9
|- bgcolor="#ccffcc"
| 49 || May 9 || @ || Sembower Field || 6-512  || Gott (2-0) || Korte (0-4) || Mahar (1) || 1,462 || 38–11 || 15–9
|- bgcolor="#ccffcc"
| 50 || May 11 || Alabama || Cliff Hagan Stadium || 4-2 || Rogers (6-3) || Turnbull (2-5) || Phillips (6) || 2,456 || 39–11 || 16–9
|- bgcolor="#ccffcc"
| 51 || May 12 || Alabama || Cliff Hagan Stadium || 7-6 || Gott (3-0) || Rosecrans (0-2) || none || 2,399 || 40–11 || 17–9
|- bgcolor="#ccffcc"
| 52 || May 12 || Alabama || Cliff Hagan Stadium || 8-1 || Littrell (8-0) || Sullivan (2-3) || Mahar (2) || 2,399 || 41–11 || 18–9
|- align="center" bgcolor="#ffbbb"
| 53 || May 15 || @ || Reagan Field || 3-7 || Handlin (5-3) || Reed (4-2) || none || 1,379 || 41–12 || 18–9
|- align="center" bgcolor="#ffbbb"
| 54 || May 17 || @Mississippi State || Dudy Noble Field || 1-3 || Stratton (10-1) || Rogers (6-4) || Holder (5) || 6,146 || 41–13 || 18–10
|- align="center" bgcolor="#ffbbb"
| 55 || May 18 || @Mississippi State || Dudy Noble Field || 3-4 || Pollorena (4-0) || Grundy (4-3) || Holder (6) || 6,478 || 41–14 || 18–11
|- align="center" bgcolor="#ffbbb"
| 56 || May 19 || @Mississippi State || Dudy Noble Field || 3-11 || Lindgren (2-2) || Littrell (8-1) || none || 6,395 || 41–15 || 18–12
|-

|-
! style="background:#005DAA;color:white;"| Post-Season (4–3) 
|-

|- bgcolor="#ccffcc"
| 57 || May 22 ||  || Regions Park || 2-0 || Reed (5-2) || Wahl (6-3) || Rogers (1) ||  || 42–15 || 1–0
|- bgcolor="#ccffcc"
| 58 || May 24|| Mississippi State || Regions Park || 5-1 || Grundy (5-3) || Graveman (4-4) || Phillips (7) || 6,798 || 43–15 || 2–0
|- align="center" bgcolor="#ffbbb"
| 59 || May 26|| Mississippi State || Regions Park || 1-2 || Routt (3-5) || Littrell (8-2) || Holder (9) ||  || 43–16 || 2–1
|-

|- align="center" bgcolor="#ffbbb"
| 60 || June 1 || Kent State || U.S. Steel Yard || 6–721 || Clark (5–0) || Reed (5–3) || none ||  || 43–17 || 0–1
|- bgcolor="#ccffcc"
| 61 || June 2 ||  || U.S. Steel Yard || 8-1 || Grundy (6-3) ||  Wild (6-4) || Shepard (1) || 677 || 44–17|| 1–1
|- bgcolor="#ccffcc"
| 62 || June 3 ||  || U.S. Steel Yard || 6-3 || Littrell (9-2) ||  Ramer (6-1) || Phillips (8) || || 45–17|| 2–1
|- align="center" bgcolor="#ffbbb"
| 63 || June 3 || Kent State || U.S. Steel Yard || 2-3 || Skulina (11-2) || Shepard (3-1)  || Wilson (7) || 761 || 45–18 || 2–2
|-

| 2012 Kentucky Wildcats Baseball Schedule

See also
Kentucky Wildcats baseball

References

External links
 Kentucky Baseball official website

Kentucky Wildcats
Kentucky Wildcats baseball seasons
Kentucky
Kentucky Wild